Cynisca muelleri is a worm lizard species in the family Amphisbaenidae. It is found in Ghana and Togo.

References

Cynisca (lizard)
Reptiles described in 1881
Taxa named by Alexander Strauch